John Lessard (July 3, 1920 – January 11, 2003) was an American composer and music educator noted among peers for his eloquent and dramatic neo-classical works for piano and voice, chamber ensembles, and orchestra, as well as for his playful pieces for mixed percussion ensembles. He was also an accomplished pianist and conductor.

Early life
Born John Ayres Lessard in San Francisco on July 3, 1920, he was raised in Palo Alto by parents with Quebec roots, quickly becoming fluent in both French and English. He began piano lessons at the age of five, then trumpet lessons at nine, and two years later joined the San Francisco Civic Symphony Orchestra. He studied piano and theory with Elise Belenky and also worked briefly with the composer Henry Cowell. At sixteen, he was offered a scholarship to study with Arnold Schoenberg, but felt so repelled by his music and the Vienna School outlook that he refused the scholarship and went to study in France. From 1937 to 1940 he was a pupil of Nadia Boulanger, Georges Dandelot, Alfred Cortot and Ernst Levy at the École Normale de Musique in Paris, earning a diploma in “Harmonie, Contrepointe et Fugue.” When Paris fell to the Germans in June 1940, he fled to the U.S. along with Boulanger, where he continued his studies with her at the Longy School of Music in Cambridge, Massachusetts, gaining another diploma. However, he was soon drafted into the U.S. Army Signal Corps. In May 1943, he was engaged to Alida White, a voice student and granddaughter of the legendary Beaux-Arts architect Stanford White. He then spent the duration of the war back in Europe with a unit assigned to liaison between American troops and allied French fighters and personnel.

Stylistic influences
Influenced early on by Igor Stravinsky and the Neo-classic School, Lessard's compositions were primarily neo-classical in style, and typically short in length; he also employed serial techniques, though not dependent on any rigid system. He was also influenced by the work of Debussy and later Webern. With a leg-up from fellow Boulanger student Aaron Copland, he was able to have his first Piano Sonata presented in 1941, winning high praise from composer and music critic Virgil Thomson along with wide public recognition. In the early post-war years he was fortunate to have performances of several of his orchestral works led by Léon Barzin, Leonard Bernstein and Thor Johnson, in New York and elsewhere.

Teaching career and later work
In 1962, he began teaching theory and composition at the newly founded State University of New York at Stony Brook, where he remained until retiring in 1990, all the while continuing to compose on his own. During the period 1964-74 Professor Lessard focused on songs for voice and piano, composing over 35 settings.

Recordings
Performances of his work were recorded on the CRI, Serenus Records, and Opus One labels, with a long gap of few recordings in the 1970s and 80s. Performers included another friend and Boulanger protégé, the harpsichordist Sylvia Marlowe.

Personal life
Lessard and his wife Alida occupied The Red Cottage on the extensive Box Hill property overlooking Nissequogue Harbor in St. James, Long Island, NY, where they raised six daughters. 

In addition to working with Alida in her capacity as an accomplished performer of lieder, Lessard also enjoyed close relations with others in the White family living nearby, often collaborating with the poet Claire Nicolas White, wife of Alida’s brother Robert White, who was a sculptor and educator. The Whites were a Social Register family related to the Wards, Astors, Winthrops, Chanlers, Roosevelts, Rockefellers, and others.

In the early 1970s, Jack and Alida were divorced. On June 12, 1973, he married Stony Brook professor and colleague Sarah Fuller, Ph.D, and resided with her at 15 Scott’s Cove Lane in nearby East Setauket. In 1996, a book written by Lessard’s eldest daughter was published, which, while using pseudonyms, contained devastating implied allegations of past improprieties with his children while intoxicated.

Death
John Lessard died in East Setauket on January 11, 2003, aged 82.

Awards and grants
Lessard received two Guggenheim fellowships (1946, 1953) as well as awards from the Alice M. Ditson Fund (1946) and the American Academy of Arts and Letters (1952). He was also given the title of Professor Emeritus of Music at SUNY Stony Brook.

Compositions

References

External links 
 John Lessard profile on American Composers Alliance website
  Original liner notes from  the  LP jacket for CRI 122, including John Lessard’s Concerto for Flute, Clarinet, Bassoon, String Quartet, and String Orchestra
  Original liner notes from the  LP jacket for CRI 208, including John Lessard’s Sonata for 'cello and Piano (1955), with Bernard Greenhouse and Menahem Pressler
  John Lessard interviewed by Bruce Duffie, May 6, 1989 (transcription)
  Biographical material about Sylvia Marlowe on Remington Records

1920 births
2003 deaths
20th-century American composers
20th-century American male musicians
American classical composers
American male classical composers
Stanford White family
American expatriates in France